I Sailed to Tahiti with an All Girl Crew is a 1969 American adventure comedy film directed and co-written by Richard L. Bare, starring Gardner McKay, Fred Clark, Pat Buttram, and Diane McBain.

It was the last film for both McKay and Clark.

Plot
Gardner bets his friend Fred $20,000 that he can beat him in a boat race to Tahiti using an all-female crew. Gardner collects a crew including a murderess and a cocktail waitress.

Cast
Gardner McKay as Terry O'Brien
Fred Clark as Generous Josh
Pat Buttram as Blodgett
Diane McBain as Liz Clark
Richard Denning as The Commodore
Betty South as the Commodore's wife
Edy Williams as Marilyn
Jeanne Ranier as Monique
Zulu as Kino, the Jailer
Arlene Charles as Janet
Mary O'Brien as Jimsy
Bebe Louie as Tomaya
Douglas Mossman as Island Chief 
AL Alawi as Chimp Leader
Duke Kahanamoku Surfer

Production
Gardner McKay was best known for the TV series Adventures in Paradise, Diane McBain was a regular on televison's Surfside 6 and Richard Denning occasionally played to Governor of Hawaii on Hawaii Five-O. The film was financed by World Entertainment Corp, a subsidiary of NTA.

Filming started 22 May 1967 on location in Hawaii. Edy Williams was borrowed from 20th Century Fox.

References

External links
I Sailed to Tahiti with an All Girl Crew at IMDb
I Sailed to Tahiti with an All Girl Crew at TCMDB

1969 films
1960s action comedy films
1960s adventure comedy films
American action comedy films
American adventure comedy films
Competitive sailing films
Films directed by Richard L. Bare
Films scored by Philip Springer
Films shot in Hawaii
Seafaring films
1969 comedy films
1960s English-language films
1960s American films